Aphyocypris arcus is a species of cyprinid in the genus Aphyocypris. It is native to the Xi River in southern China.

References

Cyprinidae
Freshwater fish of China
Cyprinid fish of Asia